Uganda competed at the 2004 Summer Paralympics in Athens, Greece. The team included two athletes, one man and one woman, neither of whom won a medal.

Sports

Athletics

Women's track

Powerlifting

See also
Uganda at the Paralympics
Uganda at the 2004 Summer Olympics

References 

Nations at the 2004 Summer Paralympics
2004
Summer Paralympics